Amalie Auguste Melitta Bentz (31 January 1873 – 29 June 1950), born Amalie Auguste Melitta Liebscher, was a German entrepreneur who invented the paper coffee filter brewing system in 1908. She founded the namesake company Melitta, which still operates under family control.

Early life
Melitta Bentz was born in Dresden, Germany, on January 31, 1873. , into a family of successful businessmen and entrepreneurs. She was born by the name of Amalie Auguste Melitta Liebscher. Her parents were Karl and Brigitte Liebscher. Her father Karl was a publisher, while her grandparents founded and owned a brewery. She married Johannes Emil Hugo Bentz, a small business owner in either 1898 or 1899, and had three children, including two sons: Willy in 1899 and Horst in 1904; and one daughter by the name of Herta in 1911.

Biography
Melitta Bentz was born as Amalie Auguste Melitta Liebscher to Karl and Brigitte Leibscher on January 31, 1873, in Dresden, Germany. where her grandparents owned a brewery, and her father worked as a book salesman and publisher.

As a housewife at the time, Bentz found that percolators were prone to over-brewing the coffee, espresso-type machines tended to leave grounds in the drink, and linen bag filters were exhausting to clean. She experimented with many means but made a two-part filtration system using blotting paper from her son Willy's school exercise book and a brass pot punctured using a nail. Bentz set up a business when the free, less bitter coffee was met with general enthusiasm.

The Kaiserliche Patentamt (Imperial Patent Office) granted her a patent on the 20th of June 1908. On the 15th of December, the company entered into the commercial register with a starting capital of 73 pfennig as "M. Bentz." 

Bentz employed her husband Hugo and her sons Horst and Willy as the new company's first employees. The family worked out of their home to assemble, package, and sell the filters. The business became an early success, and after contracting a tinsmith to manufacture the devices, they sold 1,200 coffee filters in 1909 Leipzig fair. In 1910, the company won a gold medal at the International Health Exhibition and a silver medal at the Saxon Innkeepers' Association. When the First World War broke out, metals were requisitioned for use in Zeppelin construction, and paper was rationed. The British blockade also disrupted normal business because coffee beans were impossible to import. Additionally, her husband Hugo Bentz was conscripted by the German government to serve the war effort in Romania. Bentz ran the company all by herself during the war but was eventually forced to support herself by selling cartons when filter production became impossible.

By 1928, the demand for their filters was so high that 80 workers had to work in a double-shift system. Continuing expansion caused the company to move several times within Dresden. The fast-growing company eventually moved in 1929 to Minden in eastern Westphalia as no more satisfactory production facilities could be found in Dresden. The company's headquarter has remained in Minden ever since. By that time, 169,420 filters had been produced. While her initial coffee filter design made massive waves in the coffee world, Bentz also worked on several improvements to the design, including the now-popular "fast-drip" filter, which can be recognized by its conical design. 

Bentz handed off her leadership role to her husband and Horst, one of her sons. The company was then named "Bentz & Sohn" in 1930. Two years later, Bentz transferred the majority stake in Melitta-Werke Aktiengesellschaft to Horst and Willy in 1932 but kept a hand in the business, ensuring that the employees were cared for regardless. She fostered the company's "Melitta Aid" system, a social fund for company employees, offering Christmas bonuses, increasing vacation days from six to 15 days per year, and reducing the working week to five days.  

After the outbreak of World War II, production stopped, and the company was again ordered to support production for military purposes. At the war's end, the workers relocated to old factories, barracks, and even pubs because the surviving portions of the main factory had been requisitioned as a provisional administration for the Allied troops. This condition held for 12 years. By 1948, production of filters and paper had resumed, and at the time of Bentz's death in Holzhausen, Porta Westfalica in 1950, the company valuation had reached 4.7 million Deutsche Marks.

Pain point and innovation 

Back in 1900, making coffee was no easy task. Despite the drink's growing popularity at the time, the ceramic or metal filtering devices available were rather ineffective. They tended to leave coffee grounds in the beverage, boiled grounds gave off a burnt taste and left a mess that had to be cleaned.Like countless others, Melitta Bentz started her day by making a cup of coffee using the same technologies. Whenever Bentz had to make coffee, she would be annoyed by the excess coffee grounds in the cup. Not only would the grounds affect the taste of the coffee, but it would also be a hassle to clean afterward due to the grounds getting stuck on the sides of the pot. Her family also was not able to afford cloth coffee filters at the time, which added to the issue. After consistently getting fed up with this problem, Bentz began experimenting. She found a solution to her problem when she used a clean sheet of blotting paper as a filter over a brass pot with holes. She added coffee grounds and poured boiling water over the content. The blotting paper served as filters for coffee grounds, and only the coffee-infused beverage dripped through the brass pot and into the cup. The result was a cheap, disposable, and easy-to-clean coffee filter that produced tastier coffee. Bentz first tested her innovation by sharing it with friends, to which she received positive feedback and her filter quickly became the preferred choice for their coffee brewing needs. Bentz was granted a patent for her innovation in June 1908 by the Imperial Patent Office in Berlin. Bentz would officially start her business, M. Bentz, shortly after entering it into the commercial register. By 1930, the filter's design has changed from flat-bottomed metal into cone-shaped ceramic pieces to better support paper filters.

Legacy
100 years after her invention, the grandchildren of Bentz, Thomas, and Stephen Bentz, still handle the Melitta Group KG headquartered in Minden, on the east of North Rhine-Westphalia, with 3,400 employees in 50 countries. Today, the company sells a wide variety of coffee-related products, including filters derived from Bentz's original invention. Bentz's innovation remains the precursor to all modern pour-over and drip coffee brewing worldwide.

See also
German inventors and discoverers

References

Further reading

External links
Melitta 100 Jahre: Company History

1873 births
1950 deaths
German company founders
20th-century German businesswomen
20th-century German businesspeople
Businesspeople in coffee
Businesspeople from Dresden
20th-century German inventors
Women inventors